Yevgeny Eduardovich Tsyganov (born 15 March 1979) is a Russian stage and film actor, director, screenwriter and composer.

Early life
Yevgeny Tsyganov was born in Moscow in the family of employees of the Moscow Research Institute.

Yevgeny graduated from the music school in the piano performance class. Starting from the age of nine, he spent four years playing various roles at the Taganka Theatre, where he participated in productions created especially for young viewers.

From 1993 until 1997 he performed with the youth rock band A.S. Afterwards he created a new group with his friends, Grenki, and played with friends at various clubs in and around Moscow. The band released one album and by 2004 disbanded, but again reunited in 2009.
 
In 1996 he entered the Boris Shchukin Theatre Institute, but studied there for only one year and eventually decided to change his major to film direction. 
In 1997 he entered the directing department Russian Institute of Theatre Arts, from which he graduated in 2001, where he met Pyotr Fomenko, who some time later invited Yevgeny to work together on some joint projects.

In 2000, Tsyganov played a role in the play One Absolutely Happy Village and a year later joined Pyotr Fomenko Studio Theater.

Career
In 2001, Yevgeny played a title role in the film Collector (2001) by Yuri Grymov, which was his first film role. His debut was very successful and soon the actor began to appear in various Russian films.

He got a prize at the film festival Kinotavr (2002, for his role in the film Let’s Make Love).

The movie Mermaid (2007), in which he played a major role, was selected as the Russian entry for the Academy Award for Best International Feature Film, but was not nominated.

Personal life 
Since 2005, Yevgeny has been married to actress Irina Leonova. The couple has seven children. In 2015, the actor left the family. His wife at the time was expecting their seventh child. In 2019 Tsyganov married actress Yuliya Snigir. On March 9, 2016, their son Fedor was born.

Selected filmography

References

External links
 
 Евгений Цыганов на ruskino.ru

1979 births
21st-century Russian male actors
Living people
Male actors from Moscow
Russian Academy of Theatre Arts alumni
Recipients of the Nika Award
Russian film directors
Russian male film actors
Russian male stage actors
Russian male television actors
Russian theatre directors
Russian activists against the 2022 Russian invasion of Ukraine